30-Love is a 2017 American comedy-drama film directed by Robert Cannon and starring Robert Cannon, Brenda Vaccaro, and Justin Lee.

Premise
Kelly's husband (Cannon) returns home after Kelly dies in hospital. Struggling with raising their daughter as a single parent, he chooses to instead focus on Kelly's passion for tennis. Focused on winning a tournament in her honor, he neglects raising their daughter and soon finds himself having to fight to keep his parental rights.

Cast
Robert Cannon as Kelly's Husband
Brenda Vaccaro as Hellen
Justin Lee as Johnnie
Mark Gagliardi as David
Robert Craighead as Fred

Release
30-Love raised over $10,000 on IndieGoGo for the film's premiere. It opened at the Vista Theater and had a one-week run at the Los Feliz 3 Theater.

Reception
30-Love received mixed reviews. Entertainment Monthly commented positively on the production quality but were not impressed with the story. Other critics were more positive with their reviews and appreciated the non-conventional ending.

References

External links

American comedy-drama films
Tennis films
2017 comedy-drama films
2010s English-language films
2010s American films